Frederick Martin MacMurray (August 30, 1908 – November 5, 1991) was an American actor. He appeared in more than one hundred films and a successful television series, in a career that spanned nearly a half-century. His career as a major film leading man began in 1935, but his most renowned role was in Billy Wilder's film noir Double Indemnity. During 1959–1973, MacMurray appeared in numerous Disney films, including The Shaggy Dog, The Absent-Minded Professor, Follow Me, Boys!, and The Happiest Millionaire. He played Steve Douglas in the television series My Three Sons.

Early life and education
Frederick Martin MacMurray was born on August 30, 1908, in Kankakee, Illinois, the son of Maleta (née Martin) and concert violinist Frederick Talmadge MacMurray, both natives of Wisconsin.  His aunt, Fay Holderness, was a vaudeville performer and actress. When MacMurray was an infant, his family moved to Madison, Wisconsin, where his father taught music. They relocated within the state to Beaver Dam, his mother's birthplace. MacMurray attended school in Quincy, Illinois, before earning a full scholarship to Carroll College in Waukesha, Wisconsin. He played the saxophone in numerous local bands. He did not graduate from college.

Career

A featured vocalist, MacMurray recorded with the Gus Arnheim Orchestra on "All I Want Is Just One Girl" on the Victor label in 1930, and with George Olsen on "I'm In The Market For You" and "After a Million Dreams". Before signing with Paramount Pictures in 1934, he appeared on Broadway in Three's a Crowd (1930–31) and alongside Sydney Greenstreet and Bob Hope in Roberta (1933–34).  

In the 1930s, MacMurray worked with film directors Billy Wilder and Preston Sturges, and actors Barbara Stanwyck, Henry Fonda, Humphrey Bogart, Marlene Dietrich, and in seven films, Claudette Colbert, beginning with The Gilded Lily. He co-starred with Katharine Hepburn in Alice Adams, with Joan Crawford in Above Suspicion, and with Carole Lombard in four productions: Hands Across the Table, The Princess Comes Across, Swing High, Swing Low and True Confession. Usually cast in light comedies as a decent, thoughtful character (The Trail of the Lonesome Pine), and in melodramas and musicals, MacMurray became one of the film industry's highest-paid actors of the period. In 1943, his annual salary had reached $420,000, making him the highest-paid actor in Hollywood and the fourth-highest-paid person in the nation. 

Despite being typecast as a "nice guy", MacMurray often said his best roles were when he was cast against type, such as under the direction of Billy Wilder and Edward Dmytryk. Perhaps his best known "bad guy" performance was that of Walter Neff, an insurance salesman who plots with a greedy wife to kill her husband in the film noir classic Double Indemnity. In another turn in the "not so nice" category, MacMurray played the cynical, duplicitous Lieutenant Thomas Keefer in Dmytryk's film The Caine Mutiny. Six years later, MacMurray played Jeff Sheldrake, a two-timing corporate executive in Wilder's Oscar-winning film The Apartment. In 1958, he guest-starred in the premiere episode of NBC's Cimarron City Western series, with George Montgomery and John Smith. MacMurray's career continued upward the following year, when he was cast as the father in the Disney film The Shaggy Dog. 

From 1960 to 1972, he starred in My Three Sons, a long-running, highly rated TV series. Concurrently with it, MacMurray starred in other films, playing Professor Ned Brainard in The Absent-Minded Professor and its sequel Son of Flubber. Using his star-power clout, MacMurray had a provision in his My Three Sons contract that all of his scenes on that series were to be shot in two separate month-long production blocks and filmed first. That condensed performance schedule provided him more free time to pursue his work in films, maintain his ranch in Northern California, and enjoy his favorite leisure activity, golf. Over the years, MacMurray became one of the wealthiest actors in the entertainment industry, primarily from wise real estate investments and from his "notorious frugality". After his final film The Swarm, MacMurray appeared in commercials for the 1979 Greyhound Lines bus company. Towards the end of the decade, he appeared in a series of commercials for the Korean chisenbop math calculation program.

Personal life

MacMurray was married twice. He married Lillian Lamont (legal name Lilian Wehmhoener MacMurray, born 1908) on June 20, 1936, and the couple adopted two children, Susan and Robert. After Lamont died of cancer on June 22, 1953, he married actress June Haver the following year.  The couple subsequently adopted two more children—twins born in 1956—Katherine and Laurie. MacMurray and Haver's marriage lasted 37 years, until Fred's death.

MacMurray was a businessman who became the fourth-highest-paid citizen in the United States. In 1941, he purchased land in the Russian River Valley in Northern California and established MacMurray Ranch. At the 1,750-acre ranch he raised prize-winning Aberdeen Angus cattle, cultivated prunes, apples, alfalfa and other crops, and enjoyed watercolor painting, fly fishing, and skeet shooting. MacMurray wanted the property's agricultural heritage preserved, so five years after his death, in 1996, it was sold to Gallo, which planted vineyards on it for wines that bear the MacMurray Ranch label. Kate MacMurray, daughter of Haver and MacMurray, now lives on the property (in a cabin built by her father), and is "actively engaged in Sonoma's thriving wine community, carrying on her family's legacy and the heritage of MacMurray Ranch".  In 1944, he purchased the Bryson Apartment Hotel in the Westlake, Los Angeles neighborhood and used it for about thirty years. Later in life, MacMurray insisted upon a percentage of gross of the films in which he starred.

Illness and death

A lifelong heavy smoker, MacMurray had throat cancer in the late 1970s, and it recurred in 1987. He had a severe stroke in December 1988 that paralyzed his right side and affected his speech. With therapy he made a 90 percent recovery. After suffering from leukemia for more than a decade, MacMurray died of pneumonia on November 5, 1991, in Santa Monica, California.

Awards and influence
In 1939, artist C. C. Beck used MacMurray as the initial model for the superhero character who became Fawcett Comics' Captain Marvel. MacMurray was nominated for a Golden Globe Award for Best Actor – Motion Picture Musical or Comedy for The Absent-Minded Professor. He was the first person honored as a Disney Legend in 1987.

Archive
The Academy Film Archive houses the Fred MacMurray-June Haver Collection. The film materials are complemented by papers at the Academy's Margaret Herrick Library.

Filmography

Film

Short subjects

Television

Theater

Radio
 Lux Radio Theatre – Pete Dawes ("The Gilded Lily") (1937), Victor Hallam ("Another Language") (1937), John Horace Mason ("Made for Each Other") (1940), Bill Dunnigan ("The Miracle of the Bells) (1948) 
 The Screen Guild Theater – The Philadelphia Story (1942)
 Screen Directors Playhouse – Take a Letter, Darling (1951) 
 Bright Star – George Harvey (1952–53)
 Lux Summer Theatre – The Lady and the Tumblers (1953)
 The Martin and Lewis Show – Himself (1953)

Further reading 

 Arts & Entertainment December 17, 1996 video biography

References

External links

 
 
 MacMurray Ranch timeline (documents MacMurray's involvement with the ranch)
 

1908 births
1991 deaths
20th-century American male actors
American male film actors
American male radio actors
American male stage actors
American male television actors
Burials at Holy Cross Cemetery, Culver City
California Republicans
Catholics from Illinois
Catholics from Wisconsin
Deaths from cancer in California
Deaths from leukemia
Disney people
Deaths from pneumonia in California
Male actors from Illinois
Male actors from Wisconsin
Male Western (genre) film actors
Paramount Pictures contract players
People from Beaver Dam, Wisconsin
People from Kankakee, Illinois
Vaudeville performers